Claudia Megan Urry is an American astrophysicist, who has served as the President of the American Astronomical Society, as chair of the Department of Physics at Yale University, and as part of the Hubble Space Telescope faculty. She is currently the Israel Munson Professor of Physics and Astronomy at Yale University and Director of the Yale Center for Astronomy and Astrophysics. Urry is notable not only for her contributions to astronomy and astrophysics, including work on black holes and multiwavelength surveys, but also for her work addressing sexism and sex equality in astronomy, science, and academia more generally.

Early life and education
After growing up in Indiana and Massachusetts, Urry attended college at Tufts University, double-majoring in mathematics and physics, graduating in 1977. She became interested in astronomy during the summer of her junior year when she interned at the National Radio Astronomy Observatory.

Urry earned an M.S. (1979) and a Ph.D. (1984) in physics from Johns Hopkins, where her advisor was Art Davidsen.  For her dissertation, she studied blazars at Goddard Space Flight Center with Richard Mushotzky.

Career
After finishing her Ph.D., Urry conducted a post-doctorate at M.I.T.'s Center for Space Research, working with Claude Canizares. This was followed by another post-doctorate at the Space Telescope Science Institute, after which, in 1990, the Institute hired her as a full-time astronomer.

Urry joined Yale's faculty in 2001, at that time as the only woman in the department. She served as Chair of the Yale Physics Department from 2007 to 2013. From 2013 to 2017 she served in the Presidential line of the American Astronomical Society, from 2013-2014 as President-Elect, 2014-2016 as President, and 2016-2017 as Past President. In 2020 she was named one of the American Astronomical Society's inaugural class of fellows.

Urry has been active in addressing sex inequality in astronomy and science more generally, giving more than 60 talks on the topic, including at the annual Conferences for Undergraduate Women in Physics (CUWiP). With Laura Danly, Urry co-organized the first meeting of Women in Astronomy in 1992. This meeting produced the "Baltimore Charter," which was drafted by Sheila Tobias and eventually endorsed by the Council of the American Astronomical Society. Reducing the prevalence of sexual harassment in astronomy was also an area of focus for Urry during the time she was President of the American Astronomical Society.

Urry has published over 330 papers in refereed journals. She studies supermassive black holes, known as Active Galactic Nuclei (AGN), and the relationship of normal galaxies to AGNs. She and her research group participated in the Sloan Digital Sky Survey to investigate the growth of supermassive black holes.

Awards and honors
 1976, 1977, N. Hobbs Knight Award for Physics from Tufts University
 1976, Phi Beta Kappa
 1990, Annie J. Cannon Award in Astronomy
 1999, American Physical Society Fellow
 2006, American Women in Science Fellow
 2007, Connecticut Academy of Science & Engineering
 2008, American Academy of Arts and Sciences
 2010, Women in Space Science Award
 2012, George Van Biesbroeck Prize
 2016, National Academy of Sciences
2020, American Astronomical Society Fellow
2023, American Astronomical Society High Energy Astrophysics Division Distinguished Career Prize

Further reading
 Meg Urry, "Girls and the Future of Science", Huffington Post, July 19, 2011.

References

External links 
 "Meg Urry" (faculty profile), Yale University
Oral History Interview conducted July 1, 2020, American Institute of Physics
"The Baltimore Charter for Women in Astronomy," Space Telescope Science Institute

Yale University faculty
Tufts University School of Arts and Sciences alumni
Johns Hopkins University alumni
American astrophysicists
Living people
Year of birth missing (living people)
Women astronomers
Recipients of the Annie J. Cannon Award in Astronomy
Members of the United States National Academy of Sciences
Scientific American people